Kylähullut was a Finnish hardcore punk band consisting of Alexi Laiho (Children of Bodom), Tonmi Lillman (ex-To/Die/For and Lordi), and Vesku Jokinen (Klamydia). The band name means "Village Idiots" in Finnish.

The band was formed by Alexi Laiho as a side project, in 2004. The band was created merely for the entertainment of the musicians, and took a carefree approach to their music.

Line-up 
 Vesa 'Vesku' Jokinen – Vocals (2004–2012)
 Tonmi Lillman – Drums, Bass (2004–2012; died 2012)
 Alexi Laiho – Guitar, Vocals (2004–2012; died 2020)

Discography

Albums 
 Turpa Täynnä (2005)
 Peräaukko Sivistyksessä (2007)

EPs 
 Keisarinleikkaus (2004)
 A 4-track EP released in 2004. The performers are Alexi Laiho, guitar, vocals; Tonmi Lillman, drums; Vesku Jokinen, vocals
 Lisää Persettä Rättipäille (2007)

Videos 
 Kääpiöt - Turpa Täynnä
 Kieli Hanurissa

References

External links 
 Official website
 Kråklund Records, Kylähullut

2004 establishments in Finland
2012 disestablishments in Finland
Finnish hardcore punk groups
Musical groups established in 2004
Musical groups disestablished in 2012